"A Night like This" is the second single by Caro Emerald, taken from the album Deleted Scenes from the Cutting Room Floor. It was released on 11 December 2009 in the Netherlands after it was first presented in an online Martini commercial on 16 October. Being released in 2010 in Europe, including the UK where it peaked at Number 65 in the UK Singles Chart. It was added to the 'A' list on BBC Radio One.

Writing and recording
The song was written by David Schreurs and Vince Degiorgio. Schreurs told HitQuarters he created the track for "A Night like This" while Degiorgio packed his bags to leave for his hometown Toronto, and then the two "sat down for an hour and knocked out the song". The lyrics are based on a specific scene in the 1967 Bond movie Casino Royale. "A Night Like This" was arranged by Schreurs and produced by Schreurs and Jan van Wieringen. A video for the song was shot in Amsterdam and Opatija, Lovran and Rijeka in Croatia.

The song has been used in the sixth episode of season 3 of Pretty Little Liars, "Remains of the 'A and episode 16 of The Secret Circle, "Lucky". In season one of the TV series Go On, it was used as the opening theme in one of the episodes. The song has also been used in advertising campaigns for Martini, Wrigley, Nestlé amongst others.

Track listing 
A Night like This – EP
 "A Night like This" – 3:46
 "A Night like This" (instrumental) – 3:46
 "A Night like This" (a cappella) – 3:36
 "Back It Up" (feat. Madcon) – 3:51

A Night like This – Single (Tom Trago remix)
 "A Night like This" (Tom Trago remix) – 3:51

Charts and certifications

Weekly charts

Year-end charts

Certifications

See also
List of Romanian Top 100 number ones of the 2010s

References 

2009 singles
Number-one singles in Austria
Number-one singles in Romania
English-language Dutch songs
Caro Emerald songs
Songs written by David Schreurs
2009 songs
Songs written by Vincent DeGiorgio